Franziska Mietzner (born 20 December 1988) is a German handballer who plays for Bayer Leverkusen and the German national team in left back position.

Mietzner played on the Junior European Championship in 2007 and participated at the Junior World Championship a year later, where she led the German national team to the final triumph. In the final match, with only 10 seconds left, she scored the decisive goal against Denmark to make the scoreline 23–22, thus securing the victory and the World title for Germany. She made her full international debut on 7 March 2009 in a 37–24 win over Romania.

Achievements
Junior World Championship:
Winner: 2008

Individual awards
Bundesliga Player of the Season: 2008–09
Bundesliga Topscorer: 2008–09, 2011–12

References

External links
 Franziska Mietzner profile at the German Handball Federation

1988 births
Living people
People from Oder-Spree
People from Bezirk Frankfurt
German female handball players
Sportspeople from Brandenburg
20th-century German women